The Dormoy Bathtub was a simple-to-construct, high wing racing aircraft of the 1920s.

Design and development
The Bathtub was developed by Etienne Dormoy, a French engineer at McCook Field in Dayton, Ohio as a simple low-cost and ultra-light aircraft. Dormoy would later design the Buhl Bull Pup.

The aircraft used a steel tube fuselage, with an exposed tail section. The parasol wings used wood spars with fabric covering supported by steel lift struts. The ailerons used steel control cables that were exposed in front of the leading edge of the wing. The engine was a modified Henderson motorcycle engine purchased for $325.

Operational history
The Dormoy Bathtub competed in the 1924 and 1925 National Air Races, winning the Rickenbacker Trophy in 1924. The 1925 model featured a fully covered tail section, removing its "bathtub" appearance.

An example of a 1924 Dormoy Bathtub fuselage with a Heath-Henderson engine is on display at the Motorcycle Heritage Museum in Westerville, Ohio. A large scale model of a 1924 Dormoy Bathtub is on display at the International Sport Aviation Museum in Florida.

Variants
A homebuilt design was produced by Mike Kibrel, the Kimbrel Dormoy Bathtub Mk 1, using a  Volkswagen air-cooled engine.

Specifications (Dormoy Bathtub)

See also

References

External links

 earlyaviators

1920s United States sport aircraft
Racing aircraft
Homebuilt aircraft
Parasol-wing aircraft
Single-engined tractor aircraft
Aircraft first flown in 1924
Conventional landing gear